Habenaria amplifolia is a species of orchid also called the Rarotonga ground-orchid. It is endemic to Rarotonga, growing in inland valley-bottoms and terraces. It is considered to be seriously endangered by the Cook Islands Government.

References

amplifolia
Endemic flora of the Cook Islands
Taxa named by Thomas Frederic Cheeseman